Alfred Marshall (1842–1924) was an economist.

Alfred Marshall may also refer to:

Alfred Marshall (politician) (1797–1868), United States Representative from Maine
Alfred Marshall (businessman) (1919–2013), American businessman who founded Marshalls, a chain of department stores
Alf Marshall (born 1933), footballer

See also
Alfred Marshall Bailey (1894–1978)